Juliana Frühwirt (born 18 March 1999) is a German biathlete. 
She was the gold medalist at the 2016 Winter Youth Olympics for the women's 6 km biathlon sprint.

References

External links

1998 births
Living people
German female biathletes
Biathletes at the 2016 Winter Youth Olympics
Youth Olympic gold medalists for Germany
People from Gotha (town)
Sportspeople from Thuringia
21st-century German women